Kamensky is a rural locality (a khutor) in Kruglovskoye Rural Settlement, Nekhayevsky District, Volgograd Oblast, Russia. The population was 155 as of 2010. There are 5 streets.

Geography 
Kamensky is located 30 km southwest of Nekhayevskaya (the district's administrative centre) by road. Dinamo is the nearest rural locality.

References 

Rural localities in Nekhayevsky District